Mary Louise  may refer to:

 Mary Louise (name), a name (including a list of persons with the name)
 Mary Louise (novel), a children's book by L. Frank Baum writing as Edith Van Dyne
 USS Mary Louise (SP-356), a US navy ship in service in 1917
 Mary Louise (actor), a child prodigy appearing in The Bird's Christmas Carol directed by Lule Warrenton
 Mary Louise (horse), the 1937 winner of the Swedish Trotting Criterium

See also

 Marie Louise (disambiguation)
 Mary Lou (disambiguation)
 Marylou (disambiguation)
 Mary Louisa
 Mary (given name)
 Louise (given name)
 
 
 
 
Louise (disambiguation)
Mary (disambiguation)